Stefan Olsson won the first Wheelchair Singles title at the Queen's Club Championships, defeating Stéphane Houdet in the final, 6–1, 6–4.

Seeds

Draw

Finals

References

Singles Draw

Wheelchair Singles
Queen's Club Championships